The year 2002 is the eighth year in the history of Fighting Network Rings, a mixed martial arts promotion based in Japan. In 2002 Fighting Network Rings held 7 events beginning with, Rings: World Title Series Grand Final.

Events list

Rings: World Title Series Grand Final

Rings: World Title Series Grand Final was an event held on February 15, 2002 at The Yokohama Cultural Gymnasium in Kanagawa, Japan.

Results

Rings Lithuania: Bushido Rings 4

Rings: World Title Series 5 was an event held on May 4, 2002 at The Kaunas Sport Hall in Kaunas, Lithuania.

Results

Rings Holland: Saved by the Bell

Rings Holland: Saved by the Bell was an event held on June 2, 2002 at The Sport Hall Zuid in Amsterdam, North Holland, Netherlands.

Results

Rings Lithuania: Rampage

Rings Lithuania: Rampage was an event held on August 2, 2002 in Palanga Beach Palanga, Lithuania.

Results

Rings Lithuania: Bushido Rings 5: Shock

Rings Lithuania: Bushido Rings 5: Shock was an event held on November 9, 2002 at The Vilnius Palace of Concerts and Sports in Vilnius, Lithuania.

Results

Rings Holland: One Moment In Time

Rings Holland: One Moment In Time was an event held on December 1, 2002 at The Vechtsebanen Sport Hall in Utrecht, Netherlands.

Results

Rings Lithuania: Bushido Rings 6: Dynamite

Rings Lithuania: Bushido Rings 6: Dynamite was an event held on December 14, 2002 in Kaunas, Lithuania.

Results

See also 
 Fighting Network Rings
 List of Fighting Network Rings events

References

Fighting Network Rings events
2002 in mixed martial arts